Marwa Outamghart (born 12 December 1996), commonly known as Marwa Loud, is a French singer of Moroccan origin. Her parents come from a Berber village near Beni Mellal. In 2017, she was signed to Lartiste's record label Purple Money Purple (PMP). She is best known for a number of singles, notably "Bimbo". Her debut album Loud was certified gold in 2018 reaching number 2 on the French Albums Chart and also charting in Belgium, Netherlands and Switzerland. Marwa Loud is married and keeps her husband away from the public's eye. Her song "Bad boy" rose to popularity after several videos on social media used the song  over clips of English footballer Mason Mount doing his signature goal celebration.

Discography

Albums

Singles

Featured in

Other charted songs

References

1996 births
Living people
French women singers
Musicians from Strasbourg
French people of Moroccan descent